Bia actorion, the uncertain owlet, bia owl or Actorion owlet, is a species of butterfly of the family Nymphalidae. It is found in the upper Amazon areas of Brazil, Ecuador, Peru and Bolivia.

The larvae feed on Astrocaryum murumuru and Geonoma species.

Taxonomy
Bia actorion has long been placed in the subfamily Satyrinae, but studies determined that it belonged to the Brassolinae. Currently, the genus Bia are classified as members of the subtribe Biina in the tribe Brassolini.

Subspecies
Bia actorion actorion
Bia actorion decaerulea Weymer, 1911 — Amazonas in Brazil
Bia actorion rebeli Bryk, 1953 —  Ecuador and Peru

References

Morphinae
Fauna of Brazil
Nymphalidae of South America
Taxa named by Caspar Stoll
Butterflies described in 1780